The 2021 Big Ten Men's Swimming and Diving Championships was held from March 2–6, 2021 at the McCorkle Aquatic Pavilion in Columbus, Ohio. It was the 112th annual  Big Ten-sanctioned swimming and diving championship meet.

Team standings
Full results

Swimming results 
Full results

Diving results

Awards
Big Ten Swimmer of the Championship:  Brendan Burns, Indiana

Big Ten Diver of the Championships: Andrew Capobianco, Indiana & Joey Canova, Ohio State

Big Ten Freshman of the Year: Jake Mitchell, Michigan

All-Big Ten Teams
The following swimmers were selected to the All Big-Ten Teams:

Big Ten Sportsmanship Award Honorees

References

2021 BIG 10 Men's Swimming and Diving Championships
2021 BIG 10 Men's Swimming and Diving Championships